Lucia Dvorská (born 14 July 1988) is a Slovak model who appeared in the 2009 Sports Illustrated Swimsuit Issue.  She was born in Bratislava, Slovakia.  She grew up in a village in western Slovakia, Zohor. Despite appearing in a television commercial as a child, she didn't start modeling until age 16. She was a contestant on the 2007 reality television show, A Model Life, hosted by Petra Němcová on TLC and as a result she won a $100 000 contract with "Next" Agency. Dvorská was a beauty pageant titleholder as the 2000 Little Miss World.

References

Slovak female models
Participants in American reality television series
People from Bratislava
1988 births
Living people